Leopold Theodore "Paul" Sentell (August 27, 1879 – April 27, 1923) was a professional baseball player, manager, and umpire. He played two seasons in Major League Baseball for the Philadelphia Phillies. Sentell was 5 feet, 9 inches tall and weighed 176 pounds.

Career
Sentell was born in New Orleans, Louisiana, in 1879. He started his professional baseball career in 1903 in the Cotton States League. The following season, he moved to the South Atlantic League and had a batting average of .263. In 1905, Sentell batted a career-high .315, stole 50 bases, and scored 71 runs to help the Macon Brigands win the league championship. His 137 hits that season led the South Atlantic League and were just three more than the second-place finisher, Ty Cobb, who would go on to have a Hall of Fame career in the majors.

Sentell made his MLB debut in 1906 with the Philadelphia Phillies. He appeared in 63 games that year, mostly at third base and second base, and hit .229. In early 1907, he played three games for Philadelphia but spent most of the season with the Eastern League's Jersey City Skeeters. From 1908 to 1913, Sentell played in the Southern Association for the Mobile Sea Gulls, Atlanta Crackers, and Chattanooga Lookouts. He then became a player-manager for the Galveston Pirates of the Texas League and stayed with the team for four seasons.

After his playing career ended in 1918, Sentell worked as an umpire in the Texas League for several years until the National League hired him for the 1922 and 1923 seasons. Sentell was umpiring a game in early 1923 when he collapsed on the field. He died of appendicitis a few days later.

References

External links

Retrosheet

1879 births
1923 deaths
Major League Baseball infielders
Minor league baseball managers
Major League Baseball umpires
Minor league baseball umpires
Philadelphia Phillies players
Baton Rouge Red Sticks players
Monroe Hill Citys players
Macon Highlanders players
Macon Brigands players
Jersey City Skeeters players
Mobile Sea Gulls players
Atlanta Crackers players
Chattanooga Lookouts players
Des Moines Boosters players
Galveston Pirates players
Houston Buffaloes players
Baseball player-managers
Baseball players from New Orleans
Deaths from appendicitis